Parvathy Hospital is a multi-specialty Indian hospital specializes in Bone and Joint care based in [, Chennai]. It was founded by Dr.S.Muthukumar in 1992.It is fully accredited by the National Accreditation Board for Hospital and Healthcare providers. The hospital also conducts the Annual Walkathon for the geriatric population and people who have undergone joint replacement surgeries.

About 

Parvathy Hospital is founded by Dr.S.Muthukumar in 1992 as a trauma care for accident victims. In 2016, the hospital received Full NABH Accreditation and functioning in Chennai. The hospital performed the First Navigated Hip Replacement in Asia Pacific region.

History 

 2004 Founded with 20 beds
 2007 Fully Equipped Multi-specialty Trauma Care
 2008 Brain Suite iOR (Intra-Operative CT Scan)
 2009 Protocols and Clinical care Standardization
 2010 Emergency Ambulance Relief Centers
 2011 First Navigated Hip Replacement in Asia Pacific
 2012 Successful completion of 500 Navigated Knee Replacements
 2013 Scaled to a 100-bed Hospital
 2016 Full NABH Accreditation
 2016 Orthopedic Super Specialty
 2017 Awarded Best Asian Healthcare Brand by Economic Times 
 2018 India's Greatest Healthcare Brand by FICCI
 2018 Asia’s First Knee Replacement Day Care Surgery 
 2020 Parvathy Hospital in Oragadam, Chennai Launched.
 2022 Cardiac Institute
 2022 IVF Fertility

Specializations 
The hospital is specialized in Orthopedics, Ambulance and Emergency Services, Neuro Sciences, Oral and Maxillo Facial Surgery,
Plastic and Reconstructive Surgery, Trauma Care, Foot & Ankle, Rheumatology, Spine, Sports medicine, Critical Care, IVF Fertility and Cardiology.

Awards and achievements 
 Performed cranioplasty surgery using a newly designed titanium plate to fit the skull of the accident victim of 26 years old.
 Best Healthcare Brands in India in 2017

References 

Hospitals established in 2004
Hospitals in Chennai
Health care companies of India
1992 establishments in Tamil Nadu